Lisardo (born Lisardo Emilio Guarinos Riera in Valencia, Spain, on October 7, 1970) is an actor and singer. From December 2008 to 2014, he was married to Mexican singer and actress Lisset.

Filmography

Films

Television

References

External links

1970 births
People from Valencia
Spanish emigrants to Mexico
Spanish male telenovela actors
Mexican male television actors
Living people